Tomer Yerucham, (born 6 April 1993 in Modi'in) is an Israeli footballer. He plays as a right back for Hapoel Lod.

Club career

Beitar Jerusalem
Yerucham made his debut with Beitar Jerusalem on 8 May 2012, coming on as a substitute in the final minutes of a league match against Hapoel Haifa.

Hapoel Rishon LeZion
At the end of January 2013, Yerucham was loaned to Hapoel Rishon LeZion with the aim of receiving playing time.
Yerucham made his debut with Hapoel Rishon LeZion on 11 February 2013, playing in a 2–0 victory over Beitar Shimshon Tel Aviv in Israel's second tier league. During his loan, he played in 6 matches with Hapoel Rishon LeZion.

Maccabi Yavne
In February 2014, Yerucham was loaned to Maccabi Yavne until the end of the season.

Maccabi Kiryat Gat
On 18 September 2016 released from Beitar and signed to Maccabi Kiryat Gat.

International career
Yerucham was part of Israel's under-19 squad for the 2012 UEFA U19 Championship. He played in all three games of the qualifying stage, which Israel finished in the third place. He continued to play two out of three games in the elite qualifying stage.

TV Appearance 
In 2016 Yerucham participated in the seventh season of the Israeli TV series Mehubarim (the local version of "Connected").

References

External links
  Profile page at Israel Football Association
  Profile page at Beitar Jerusalem's official site

1993 births
Living people
Israeli footballers
Beitar Jerusalem F.C. players
Hapoel Rishon LeZion F.C. players
Maccabi Yavne F.C. players
Maccabi Kiryat Gat F.C. players
Hapoel Marmorek F.C. players
Bnei Jaffa F.C. players
Hapoel Lod F.C. players
Israeli Premier League players
Liga Leumit players
Association football defenders
Footballers from Modi'in-Maccabim-Re'ut
Israeli people of Romanian-Jewish descent